Aag Laga Do Sawan Ko (English translation - Fire Up The Winter) is 1991 Hindi language movie directed by Anup Malik, starring Harish Patel, Kuldeep Malik, Sargam, Reema and Ajit Vachhani.

Music
Lyrics: Anil Khanna 

"Ek To Mausam Bada Suhana" - Falguni Seth, Vinod Rathod
"Jis Mitti Mein Pyar Nahin" - Uttara Kelkar
"Mausam Sard Hai Raat Hai Jawan" - Falguni Seth
"Pani O Paani" - Asha Bhosle
"Tawaif Hoon Dil Sabka Bahelaungi" - Asha Bhosle

References

External links 
 

Films scored by Usha Khanna
1991 films
1990s Hindi-language films